The 1954 FIBA World Championship squads were the squads of the 1954 FIBA World Championship. Each one of the 12 teams at the tournament selected a squad of 12 players.

Group A

Brazil
4 Wilson Bombarda
5 Ângelo Bonfietti
6 José Henrique Carli
7 Almir Nelson de Almeida
8 Algodão
9 Mayr Facci
10 Fausto Sucena Rasga Filho
11 Jamil Gedeão
12 Amaury Pasos
13 Alfredo da Motta
14 Wlamir Marques
coach Togo Renan Soares

Paraguay
3 Antonio Zapattini Ortiz
4 Reinaldo Cálcena
5 Antonio F. Coscia
6 Gustavo Bendlin Souza Lobos
7 Oswaldo Mongelós
8 Francisco S. Yegros
9 Rubén Darío Olavarrieta Onieva
10 Federico Abente
11 José Emilio Gorostiaga
12 Jorge Bogado
13 Arístides Isusi
14 Óscar Amarilla
coach Carlos Rojas y Rojas

Philippines
Head coach: Herminio Silva

Group B

Canada
Head coach: Jim Bulloch

Peru

United States
Head coach: Warren Womble

Group C

France

Uruguay
4 Oscar Moglia
5 Martín Acosta y Lara
6 Héctor García Otero
7 Roberto Lovera
8 Nelson Demarco
9 Adesio Lombardo
10 Carlos Roselló
11 Omar Zubillaga
12 Hector Costa
13 Raul Mera
14 Manuel Usher Ferrer
15 Julio Cesar Gully
coach Prudencio de Pena

Yugoslavia
3 Bogdan Müller
4 Mirko Marjanović
5 Milan Bjegojević
6 Đorđe Andrijašević
7 Lajos Engler
8 Đorđe Konjović
9 Dragan Godžić
10 Milan Blagojević
11 Aleksandar Blašković
12 Boris Kristančič
13 Vilmos Lóczi
14 Borislav Ćurčić
coach Aleksandar Nikolić

Group D

Chile

China

Israel

References

FIBA Basketball World Cup squads